The following is a list of fictional astronauts from recent times, mostly using the Space Shuttle, as depicted in works released between 1990 and 1999.

1990–1999

Notes

References

Lists of fictional astronauts